John Murtaugh may refer to:
 John F. Murtaugh (1874–1918), American lawyer and politician from New York
 John Brian Murtaugh (1937–2017), American politician from New York